Robin Haase won the tournament, defeating Florent Serra in the final.

Seeds

Draw

Finals

Top half

Bottom half

References

External links
 Main Draw
 Qualifying Draw

Open de la Reunion - Singles
Open de la Reunion - Singles
Open de la Reunion - Singles